Fashion District may refer to:

 Fashion District (Los Angeles)
 Fashion District, Toronto
 Fashion District, New York City
 Fashion District Philadelphia

See also 
 Wynwood Fashion District, sub-district of Wynwood in Miami
 Quadrilatero della moda, Milan
 Garment District (disambiguation)